Mark Huberman (born 1981) is an Irish actor.

Early life
Mark Huberman grew up in Cabinteely, south Dublin. His father Harold was born in London; his mother Sandra is from County Wexford. His sister, Amy Huberman, is an actress.

Career
He is an actor known for his performances on TV and Film.

Filmography

References

External links
 

21st-century Irish male actors
Irish male film actors
Irish male television actors
1981 births
Living people
Irish people of Jewish descent